Lasher-Davis House is a historic home located at Nelliston in Montgomery County, New York.  It was built in 1865 and is a small, -story frame building with a gable roof.  It features an attractive porch with cut-out railings and brackets under the porch eaves.

It was added to the National Register of Historic Places in 1980.

References

Houses on the National Register of Historic Places in New York (state)
Houses completed in 1865
Houses in Montgomery County, New York
National Register of Historic Places in Montgomery County, New York